The sole Kawanishi K-2 was the first specialized Japanese racing aircraft. The advanced, single-seat low-wing monoplane's first flight was in the late summer of 1921. It had a promisingly high maximum speed but a career limited by numerous minor accidents produced no victories or records.

Design and development
In the early 1920s the Japanese Imperial Flying Association sponsored flying exhibitions which included competitive racing. Yukichi Goto had piloted the Kawanishi K-1 mailplane at such events and suggested that the company should build a specialized racing aircraft. The K-2 was the result and was advanced for its biplane-dominated times. Like them, the K-2 had a wooden structure and was fabric covered but was a low wing monoplane. As originally designed, the K-2 had an internally braced cantilever wing but Goto suggested the addition of bracing wires. Later these wires were replaced by short, parallel pairs of struts from the upper fuselage longerons to the wing spars. The form of bracing used for the first flight, made in the summer of 1921, is not known but most photographs show it with struts.

The K-2 was powered by a  Hall-Scott L-6 water-cooled, upright straight six engine. The cowling was carefully faired into the fuselage behind it, streamlining in keeping with the rest of the K-2 apart from its radiator and landing gear. The radiator was mounted just above the fuselage near the rear of the engine in a rather rectangular profile enclosure. The pilot's open cockpit was well behind the wing trailing edge. Behind it the lower fuselage was flat-sided and tapering in plan, with a rounded decking topped by a fairing which began as a headrest and deepened rearwards. Near the tail the upper and lower fuselage sides merged to make flat surfaces which stabilized the aircraft in yaw; there was no separate fin. Instead, the narrow balanced rudder was hinged on the extreme fuselage. The K-2's rectangular plan horizontal tail was mounted on top of the main fuselage structure, well forward of the rudder.

Its conventional, fixed landing gear was not faired. The main wheels were on split axles, hinged centrally on the vertex of a transverse V-strut mounted on the lower fuselage longerons. The landing legs and trailing drag struts were also mounted on the lower fuselage.

Operational history

Specifications

References

Low-wing aircraft
Single-engined tractor aircraft
1920s Japanese sport aircraft
Kawanishi aircraft
Aircraft first flown in 1921